Lil James is an American rapper and hip hop recording artist from Atlanta, Georgia by way of Detroit, Michigan. He released his major label debut mixtape, 21 Years Later, in August 2018. He is currently signed to Don Cannon and DJ Drama's record label, Generation Now (an imprint of Atlantic Records).

Early life
Lil James was born in Detroit, Michigan. His mother passed away early in his life, and he spent a large portion of his childhood in foster care. He began rapping at age 3. When he was 10 years old, Lil James moved to Atlanta, Georgia. As an adolescent, he had occasional run-ins with law enforcement, but later turned his focus toward music.

Career
Lil James released two singles in 2017, "Followers" and "Can't Do It." By March 2018, he had been signed to Don Cannon and DJ Drama's Atlantic Records imprint, Generation Now. That month, he performed at South by Southwest for the first time. In April 2018, he released a music video for his song, "Followers", directed by SpuddsMckenzie.

In June 2018, he was featured alongside Jack Harlow and Sixteen on the Skeme song, "Get Sumn." The following month, Lil James was featured on the song, "Gang," as part of Skeme's Big Money Sonny mixtape. In August 2018, he released his first major label mixtape, 21 Years Later. The album had features from Kap G and Jacquees. The music video for the lead single, "Traphouse," was released in October 2018 via WorldStarHipHop.

Discography

Mixtapes

Singles

References

External links
Artist profile on Generation Now

Living people
Rappers from Atlanta
Rappers from Detroit
Atlantic Records artists
Southern hip hop musicians
African-American male rappers
Year of birth missing (living people)
21st-century African-American people